Our Story may refer to:

 Our Story (book), autobiography about the Kray twins
 Our Story (film), 1984 film directed by Bertrand Blier
 OurStory Scotland, a community history and oral history project
 "Our Story", an episode of the television series Teletubbies
 Westlife - Our Story, an autobiography about the Irish band Westlife
 "Our Story" (song), a 2015 song by Virginia to Vegas
 Our Story: A Memoir of Love and Life in China, 2018 autobiographical comic book

See also